UK Today was a BBC television news programme shown on most digital satellite and digital terrestrial versions of BBC One and BBC Two. It consisted of a round up of stories from the BBC's various local news programmes where it had not initially been possible to show regional variations. The programme was eventually replaced by digital feeds of each regional news service, finishing in 2002.

History
When the BBC started digital broadcasts, the various English regional versions of BBC One and Two were not available. BBC One carried variants only for Northern Ireland, Scotland and Wales, whilst no variations were broadcast for BBC2; instead it had been decided to carry four variants of the new BBC Choice.

Lack of English variations on Satellite was due to a single broadcast feed being able to cover the entirety of England (in reality it could cover much of north and western Europe) whilst on digital terrestrial it was due to the regional broadcast centres in England not yet being equipped to 'opt in and out' of the digital network when digital terrestrial broadcasts began in 1998.

This presented a problem with two obvious solutions – either just show the BBC South East version of the channels (already used as a 'sustaining feed' in case of failure at the regional centres), or create new programming to fill the gaps. The decision was taken to go with the second option, although any non-news programming (such as the regional political slot) was filled by the South East region.

Despite the name, UK Today very rarely broadcast to the whole of the UK as BBC One Scotland, BBC One Northern Ireland, and BBC One Wales were available with their own news programming from the very start of digital enjoying their own satellite feeds and being fully equipped for digital terrestrial. Only BBC Two would carry UK Today to the whole of the UK.

In 2000, BBC Breakfast, a simulcast programme between BBC One and BBC News 24 was launched. Regional opt-outs on BBC News 24 carried UK Today across the UK.

Main bulletins at 1.30pm and 6.30pm were originally broadcast from within the BBC News 24 studio (N8), and simulcast on that channel though the set was later moved to the same studio as the BBC One news bulletins (N6).

Gradual demise
UK Today was gradually replaced on BBC One as regional centres were upgraded for digital terrestrial broadcasting and the non-England versions of BBC Two went digital on both satellite and terrestrial in 2001, replacing the four regional variants of BBC Choice. In 2002 the satellite version of BBC One England started carrying the London region's programme, BBC London News, although an interactive service did allow viewers to select one of four alternate regional programmes, including South Today and North West Tonight for the main 6.30pm news bulletin. In May 2003 all regional services were made available to satellite viewers by effectively broadcasting seventeen separate feeds of BBC One, one for each region. (see BBC UK regional TV on satellite)

Today
Due to the minimal regional broadcasting on BBC Two in England, it was not seen as cost-effective to create digital versions of these regions. On satellite, this would have meant as many individual feeds of BBC Two as BBC One whilst in the case of digital terrestrial, a decision to encode all BBC services other than BBC One using the more efficient statistical multiplexing technique made it technically and economically much harder to provide variations without either equipping each regional centre with costly equipment or using the same method as for BBC One and suffering reduced picture quality as a result. Consequently, short BBC London bulletins continued to be broadcast throughout England on BBC Two.

In 2004, all regional news bulletins were moved to BBC One and in 2006, the last remaining regional programme, The Super League Show, shown in some northern regions was also moved. Although it was still technically possible for most regions to opt out on analogue, any variation in programming was now rare. The teletext service Ceefax, did still carry regional content on BBC Two until analogue switch-off, however. During the 2006 Commonwealth Games, BBC Breakfast was shown on BBC Two, so regional opt-outs on the digital variant in England were replaced by a newspaper review for digital viewers. During the Wimbledon tennis competitions of 2008, a scheduled news bulletin was moved to BBC Two. As some regions had already switched to digital-only TV, these areas received only BBC London News instead of their local news.

See also

BBC UK regional TV on satellite

1998 British television series debuts
2002 British television series endings
BBC television news shows